GX5 may refer to:

Automobiles
 Gonow Aoosed GX5, a 2010–2014 Chinese mid-size SUV
 Zedriv GX5, a 2019–present Chinese subcompact electric SUV
 Gleagle GX5, a 2010 and 2012 Chinese subcompact SUV concept

Other uses